Henry Douglas McIver (1841–1907) was an American mercenary who fought for 18 countries during the nineteenth-century.

Early life
McIver was born in 1841. He spent first ten years of his life in Virginia, United States, and then he was sent to his uncle, General Donald Graham, to finish school and prepare for West Point. Instead of West Point, McIver joined the private army of the East India Company when he was only 16 years old.

Career
He was sent to India in 1858. At that time, the Sepoy Mutiny (Sepoy - native soldiers in the East Indian Company army) raged in India. In his first battle, McIver was seriously wounded.

In 1860, McIver fought under Giuseppe Garibaldi in Italy, and after that joined the pretender for the Spanish crown, Don Carlos.

When the American Civil War broke out, Henry McIver joined the Confederate side. Although he was only 20 years old at the time he was already an experienced soldier. While fighting for the Confederates, he was under the command of three famous Confederate generals: Jackson, Stewart and Smith. At the end of the war, he challenged a Union officer, Major Tomlin, to a duel, which he won, running Tomlin through the body. When the Confederacy capitulated, McIver fled to Mexico, where he joined Emperor Maximilian in fighting Juárez’s rebels.

In Mexico he was captured by Indians, and escaped three months later by swimming across the Rio Grande.  He fought at Monterrey, and for his deeds received the title of count. When the Juárez rebellion was successful, Maximilian was executed, and McIver fled to Tampico, where he boarded a ship and left for South America.

In the War of 1877-1878, McIver offered his services to the Serbians, initially being commissioned a colonel of volunteers and later rising to the rank of general and overall cavalry commander of the Serbian contingents.

In 1883, McIver organized a company for British colonization of New Guinea; the project had to be abandoned in 1884 after failing to gain the approval of the Earl of Derby.

Death
McIver died in 1907.

References
 General of Serbian cavalry Henry MacIver, Генерал српске коњице Хенри Мекајвер - Serbum magazine
er
Under Fourteen Flags: Being the Life and Adventures of Brigadier-General Maciver, a Soldier of Fortune by Capt. W. D. L'Estrange

External links
, by Richard Harding Davis from Project Gutenberg

1841 births
1907 deaths
Confederate States Army soldiers
American mercenaries
Foreign volunteers in Serbian armies
Serbian–Turkish Wars (1876–1878)
Duellists